The Hit List is a British music game show that puts three pairs of contestants against each other to test their knowledge of music, which began airing on Saturday nights on BBC One on 25 May 2019. The show is hosted by husband and wife Marvin and Rochelle Humes, and it is their first stand alone TV show as a couple.

Production 
A pilot of the format was made at Dock10 studios in Manchester in 2018 under the name PlayListers.
The BBC commissioned six episodes in November 2018. The show has been recommissioned every year since, with series 3 comprising 12 episodes.

Format 
Across three rounds, the contestants attempt to identify huge hits from across the years. The teams must prove their ability to recognise songs from all genres of music for a chance to win £10,000.

 Round One – The teams are played a selection of clips from hit tracks and must press their buzzer whenever they recognise a song. All the songs in this round are themed, so the contestants might need to identify two songs written by the same songwriter, or recall what song was at number two in the charts when another was at number one. The teams must rely on their music memory to answer quickly enough. The first two teams to give five correct answers progress through to round two.
 Round Two – The two remaining teams must identify a range of song titles and artists in 45 seconds by listening to the very beginning of the songs and recognising them before the time runs out. The teams are given visual clues to help them, such as a map showing where the singer is originally from, or an image of a famous person who is mentioned in the song lyrics. Each team must work against the clock to ensure their time does not run out. The first team to run out of time will be eliminated and the other team advances to the Final.
 Round Three – The Final Chart Rundown – This round sees the final team attempting to recognise ten songs and artists before the money runs out. The team will start the round with £10,000 available in their pot of money, but after five seconds of each track that is played, the money starts to drop at a rate of £100 per second. If the team can correctly name ten song titles and artists before the money disappears, they will go home with whatever is left in the pot. Otherwise, they will leave with nothing (This rule does not apply in the Celebrity Specials where if the celebrities don't succeed they'll leave with £500 for their chosen charities).

Transmissions

Specials

International versions

References

External links 
 
 

2019 British television series debuts
2010s British music television series
2020s British music television series
2010s British game shows
2020s British game shows
BBC Scotland television shows
BBC television game shows
English-language television shows